The American animated television series DuckTales (1987–1990) has given rise to a variety of marketed goods, beginning with the broadcasts in the 1980s. These include video cassettes and DVDs of the original episodes, video games and toys with a DuckTales theme, and books, including comic books.  Some are still being brought out in the 2010s, with a reboot animated series airing in 2017 and receiving its own merchandise.

Home video releases

VHS releases

US releases
Ten VHS cassettes containing 20 episodes of the series were released in the United States.

On October 5, 1993, Disney released a VHS containing Halloween specials, for the upcoming holiday season. The specials it featured were from the company's four arguably most popular series at the time, Chip 'n Dale Rescue Rangers, Darkwing Duck, DuckTales and Goof Troop.

The DuckTales episode "Ducky Horror Picture Show" was released together with the Goof Troop episode "Frankengoof" on one VHS cassette as a special release called Monster Bash.

UK, Australia and New Zealand releases
Ten VHS cassettes containing 23 episodes of the series were released in the United Kingdom, Australia and New Zealand.

DVD releases

US (Region 1)
Walt Disney Studios Home Entertainment has released some of the series on DVD; three volumes have been released in Region 1 thus far featuring the first 75 episodes of the series. The first was released on November 8, 2005 (containing episodes 1–27), the second on November 14, 2006 (containing episodes 28–51) and the third volume on November 13, 2007 (containing episodes 52–75). The sets were package in a box containing 3 slipcases, one for each disc.  There is currently no word on a fourth and final DVD release containing the final 25 episodes.

The episodes are in the order that they originally aired (except for the five-part serial "Treasure of the Golden Suns," placed at the beginning of Volume 2).  None of the DVD sets contain any special features.

International (Region 2)
In the United Kingdom, Disney released one Region 2 volume in 2007, titled DuckTales First Collection. Despite the set being similar to the US version, the DVD contained only 20 episodes, while having 5 language tracks: English, French, German, Spanish and Italian. Other regional versions were distributed to other countries, but only going up to episode #20. On November 12, 2012, the UK received two further releases of Collection 2 and Collection 3, being a Region version of the 2nd and 3rd volumes from the US. Unlike the first release, these 3-disc sets include a Fastplay mode, and only four language tracks: English, Dutch, German and French, but subtitles have not been added.

There are currently no plans to release the rest of the series, or the seven episodes missing between the first two sets.

2017 Home media 
A DVD titled Woo-oo! was released on December 19, 2017, in the US and on July 9, 2018, in the UK and Ireland. The DVD contains the pilot episode and all 6 Welcome to Duckburg shorts. A second DVD titled Destination Adventure! was released on June 5, 2018. It contains the episodes The Beagle Birthday Massacre!, The Living Mummies of Toth-Ra!, The Impossible Summit of Mt. Neverrest!, The Spear of Selene!, The Missing Links of Moorshire!, and Beware the B.U.D.D.Y. System!, as well as 2 episodes of the original 1987 series previously unreleased on DVD (New Gizmo Kids on the Block and Ducky Mountain High).

Video games

Books
 The Hunt for the Giant Pearl (Little Golden Book) - 1987
 Welcome to Duckburg (with audio cassette) - 1987
 Launchpad's Daring Raid (with audio cassette) - 1987
 Dinosaur Ducks (with audio cassette) - 1987
 Scrooge's Treasure Hunt (with audio cassette) - 1987
 Silver Dollars for Uncle Scrooge (Golden Tell-A-Tale Book) - 1988
 Disney's DuckTales: The Secret City Under the Sea (A Little Golden Book) - 1988
 Webby Saves the Day (Disney's Duck Tales) (Disney's Wonderful World of Reading) - 1989
 Disney's Duck Tales: The Great Lost Treasure Hunt (Golden Look-Look Book) - Jun 1989
 Scrooge McDuck and the Big Surprise (Golden Easy Reader Level 2) - 1990
 Masters of the Genie and Send in the Clones (DuckTales) by Disney Staff - Feb 1990
 Back to the Klondike and Superdoo! (DuckTales) by (Disney Staff) - Feb 1990
 Sweet Duck of Youth and Double-O-Duck (DuckTales) by (Walt Disney Company) - Mar 1990
 Sphinx for the Memories and Sir Gyro Gearloose (DuckTales) by (Disney Staff) - Apr 1990
 Disney's Duck Tales: Down the Drain (Golden Look-Look Book) - 1990
 Ducktales: Christmas at the North Pole (Grolier Enterprises, Inc.) - 1997
 DuckTales: Solving Mysteries and Rewriting History! by Rob Renzetti and Rachel Vine (Disney Press) – 2018

Comic books
 Ducktales - (Gladstone) July 1988 to May 1990
 DuckTales - (Disney) June 1990 to November 1991
 Disney's Colossal Comics Collection - (Disney) October 1991 to April 1993
 Disney Presents Carl Barks' Greatest DuckTales Stories - (Gemstone) May to July 2006
 Uncle Scrooge #392 - 399 (Boom! Studios) June 2010 - January 2011
 Ducktales - (Boom! Studios)  February 2011
 DuckTales - (IDW Publishing) July 2017 – present

Clothes 
 DuckTales T-shirt (Disney Store) 2017
 DuckTales Hoodies (Disney Store) 2017
 Ducktales Team Ducktales T-shirt (Amazon) 1987

Party Supplies 
 Valentine's Day Cards - DuckTales (Disney) - 1987
 DuckTales (Party Supplies) - 1988
 DuckTales - 5 Party Candles (by Unique) - 1989
 DuckTales - 8 Blowout Party Favors (by Unique) - 1990
 DuckTales - 8 Look Bags (by Unique) - 1991
 Ducktales Shades - Scrooge McDuck (by Sun-Staches) - 2020

House Stuffs 
 DuckTales Mugs (Disney Store) 2017

Backpacks 
 DuckTales (Backpack by Longuefly) 2019

Pinbacks, bobbles, and lunchboxes
 Disney's DuckTales - Pencil Case Pouch Vintage (by Walt Disney) - 1989
 Disney's DuckTales - Lunch Box with Thermos (by Aladdin) - 1990
 Disney's DuckTales - Lunchbox and Plastic Thermos (by Hallmark) - 2019

Pins
 Disney Afternoon (Pin Versions):
 Pin 4527: Webbigail Vanderquack (Webby) by DLRP (1987)
 Pin 18196: Duck Tales: Huey, Dewey, Louie, & Webigail (1987)
 Pin 19665: Duck Tales (Scrooge & Nephews) (1987)
 Pin 32666: DuckTales: Set of 8 Puffy Pins (1987)
 Pin 72417: Ducktales & Rescue Rangers by Button (1989-1991)
 Pin 13823: Disney Afternoon with Baloo, Scrooge, Cubbi, Chip 'n' Dale (1990)
 Pin 17447: Disney Afternoon Button (1990)
 Pin 17597 Disney Afternoon Live! Button (1991)
 Pin 39275: Disney Afternoon Avenue Opens (Spinner) by Magical Milestones (1991)
 Pin 91451: Walt Disney's World On Ice Afternoon Button (1991)
 Pin 92571: Disney Afternoon Mystery Set (2012)
 Pin 125776: Disney XD's Ducktales (Reboot) by Button (2017)

Toys

1987
 Applause releasing as Figurines as DuckTales

1988
 3D Puzzles as Scrooge McDuck from DuckTales (in Piece Plastic Puzzle) from Disney Store
 McDonald's release as Happy Meals, one of the Toy Set from Disney's DuckTales
 Simba releasing one of the plush dolls based from Disney's DuckTales

1989
 Golden release a Magic Plate Plus as DuckTales
 Walt Disney release a Beagle Boy with his Truck/Vehicle from DuckTales
 TGS release a Cassette Player from DuckTales in Germany.
 MB releases a DuckTales board game.

1990
 Two DuckTales 3D Puzzles (Louie and Launchpad McQuack) by Arco/Mattel
 McDonald's release as Happy Meals, one of the Binocular from Disney's DuckTales
 McDonald's release as Happy Meals, one of the Camera Light Vintage from Disney's DuckTales

1991
 Colorfroms releasing the Adventure Set on Disney's DuckTales
 Ducktales was as part of Disney Afternoon Figures from Kellogg's Cereals.
 Grow Jogos e Brinquedos releases a board game titled DuckTales: Treasure of Pyramid.

1993
 In 1993, Sonrics releasing as Sonric's Meal, an Figurines basing on Disney characters, including a DuckTales (9 Different Toys).

1995
 McDonald's Australia releases a DuckTales Keyrings.

1996
 In March 1996, Sonrics releasing an figurines basing on Disney characters calling Splashers, including for DuckTales (7 Different Toys).

2011
 Vinylmation releasing figures based on Disney Afternoon series, including by DuckTales as Scrooge McDuck, Launchpad McQuack and Fenton Crackshell.

2016
 Grand Jester Studios releases new busts of Disney Afternoon characters, as DuckTales and Chip 'n Dale Rescue Rangers And Action Figures.

2017
 Monogram releasing a 3D Foam Key Chain collection with the unboxing of a new blind bag assortment: DuckTales
 Funko releasing Pop Vinyls based on DuckTales: Scrooge McDuck, Huey, Dewey, Louie, Magica de Spell and Webby
 DuckTales is part of Funko's Mystery Minis from Disney Afternoon.

2018
 Disney Store Europe, releases DuckTales plush dolls of Huey, Dewey, Louie and Webby.

2019
 Steve Jackson Games releases the card game Munchkin Disney DuckTales.

References

Merchandise
DuckTales
DuckTales merchandise